Dulalpur is a village in Comilla District in the Chittagong Division of Eastern Bangladesh.

Mosques

References 

Cumilla District